Big Lizard in My Backyard is the debut album by the Dead Milkmen, released by Restless Records in 1985.

Although the album yielded no singles, it achieved enough notoriety to create a fan base for the band. Five of the album's tracks appear on the 1997 compilation Death Rides a Pale Cow: The Ultimate Collection; four tracks appear on the 1998 compilation Cream of the Crop.

Production
Big Lizard in My Backyard was produced by John Wicks and the band. The introduction to "Bitchin' Camaro" was improvised.

Cover artwork
The album's cover artwork was designed by the band's drummer, Dean Clean.

Critical reception
Big Lizard in My Backyard received strong reviews, with critics singling out "Bitchin' Camaro", calling it "hilarious" and "career-making." Maximum Rocknroll wrote that "these 20 satire-laced songs are real crack-ups, and backed up by tight playing that incorporates funk, country, and lots of other styles into their punk approach." Spin called the album "frenetic goof pop," writing that it's "full of the kind of scruff-and-tumble guitar and funtime lyrics that made 1977 punk such a refreshing blast."

Track listing 
All tracks written by the Dead Milkmen

 "Tiny Town" - 1:45
 "Beach Song" - 2:00
 "Plum Dumb" - 1:56
 "Swordfish" - 1:31
 "V.F.W. (Veterans of a Fucked Up World)" - 1:48
 "Rastabilly" - 1:07
 "Serrated Edge" - 1:59
 "Lucky" - 2:10
 "Big Lizard in My Backyard" - 1:59
 "Gorilla Girl" - 1:33
 "Bitchin' Camaro" - 3:01
 "Filet of Sole" - 1:57
 "Spit Sink" - 2:01 (Produced By Mike Ace & Jonny Earthshoe)
 "Violent School" - 1:58
 "Takin’ Retards to the Zoo" - 0:48 (Produced By Mike Ace & Jonny Earthshoe)
 "Junkie" - 0:52
 "Right Wing Pigeons" - 2:21
 "Dean’s Dream" - 1:49
 "Laundromat Song" - 1:47
 "Nutrition" - 2:17
 "Tugena" - 5:27 (instrumental)

Personnel
The Dead Milkmen
 Dave Blood – bass guitar
 Joe Jack Talcum – guitar, vocals
 Rodney Anonymous – vocals
 Dean Clean – drums

References

External links
 Official Site Discography

The Dead Milkmen albums
1985 debut albums
Restless Records albums